Ilma Rakusa (born 2 January 1946) is a Swiss writer and translator. She translates French, Russian, Serbo-Croatian and Hungarian into German.

Biography
Ilma Rakusa was born in 1946 in Rimavská Sobota, Slovakia to a Slovenian father and a Hungarian mother. She spent her early childhood in Budapest, Ljubljana and Trieste. In 1951, her family moved to Zürich, Switzerland. Ilma Rakusa attended the Volksschule and the Gymnasium in Zürich. After the Matura, she studied Slavic and Romance Languages and Literature in Zürich, Paris and Leningrad between 1965 and 1971.

In 1971, she was awarded a doctorate for her thesis titled Studien zum Motiv der Einsamkeit in der russischen Literatur, about themes of loneliness in Russian literature. From 1971 to 1977, she was a Wissenschaftlicher Assistent at the Slavic Seminar at the University of Zurich (UZH).

In 1977, Rakusa authored her first book, a collection of poems titled Wie Winter. She has since published numerous collections of poems, collected short stories and essays. Rakusa works as a translator from French, Russian, Serbo-Croatian and Hungarian into German. She has translated works by authors including the French novelist Marguerite Duras, the Russian writer Aleksey Remizov, the Hungarian author Imre Kertész, the Russian poet Marina Tsvetaeva and the Serbo-Croatian Danilo Kiš. Rakusa also works as a journalist (Neue Zürcher Zeitung and Die Zeit). Rakusa's novel Mehr Meer (2009) has been translated into many languages and received the Swiss Book Prize in 2009.

In 2010/2011, she was a fellow at the Berlin Institute for Advanced Study.

Today, Ilma Rakusa lives as a freelance writer in Zürich.

Awards and honors

 1987:  of the 
 1991: Petrarca translation award
 1995: Swiss Writer-in-residence Max Kade Institute at the University of Southern California
 1998: Leipzig Book Award for European Understanding (Commendation Award)
 1998: 
 2003: 
 2003: Adelbert von Chamisso Prize
 2004: Johann-Jakob-Bodmer-Medaille der Stadt Zürich
 2005: Vilenica International Literary Prize
 2005  by the Mitteleuropazentrum of the Technical University of Dresden and the Sächsische Akademie der Künste
 2009: Swiss Book Prize for Mehr Meer. Erinnerungspassagen.
 2010/2011: Fellow at the Berlin Institute for Advanced Study
 2015: 
 2017: 
 2019: Kleist Prize

Bibliography
 
 
 
 
 
 
 
 
 
 
 
 
 
 
 
  (Afterword by Kathrin Röggla)

As editor

Translations into German

References

1946 births
Living people
20th-century Swiss journalists
21st-century Swiss journalists
20th-century Swiss non-fiction writers
21st-century Swiss non-fiction writers
20th-century Swiss novelists
21st-century Swiss novelists
20th-century Swiss poets
21st-century Swiss poets
20th-century translators
21st-century translators
Kleist Prize winners
People from Rimavská Sobota
Swiss Book Prize winners
Swiss essayists
Swiss people of Hungarian descent
Swiss people of Slovenian descent
Swiss translators
Swiss women journalists
Swiss women non-fiction writers
Swiss women novelists
Swiss women poets
Swiss women short story writers
Translators to German
Translators from French
Translators from Hungarian
Translators from Russian
Translators from Serbian
Academic staff of the University of Zurich
Swiss women essayists
Writers from Zürich
Literary translators